The Anti-Seismic Monument or Tangshan Earthquake Monument  is located in the eastern part of the center square in Tangshan City, and the Tangshan Earthquake Memorial Hall museum is on the western part of the square. The Monument Square measures 320 m long from east to west and 170 m wide from south to north, covering an area of 5.4 hectares. It is a monument to the city's dauntless spirit.

Description
The Anti-Seismic Monument is composed of main monument and a secondary monument. The main monument tells the heroic stories of earthquake relief. The secondary monument describes the history of the Tangshan earthquake in the form of ruins. The monument's pedestal is 3 m high and the body is 30 m high.

The body is composed by four trapezoidal pillars. The pillars symbolize the buildings which collapsed during the earthquake and the new architecture which soars above the horizon. The top of the pillars resembles four huge hands reaching the sky and symbolizing that "Mankind Can Conquer Nature." The four sides of monument's body include eight engravings which symbolize the support Tangshan received from other parts of China. The monument body is reinforced concrete, and the surface is granite. In the center is a frontispiece with the words "Tangshan Earthquake Monument," written by Hu Yaobang.

References

External links

Monuments and memorials in China
Buildings and structures in Tangshan